The .50 Remington Navy is a  American rimfire handgun cartridge.

The rimfire version was replaced in 1866 by a centerfire equivalent. A Boxer-primed version remained commercially available until World War I.

The power of the .50 Remington was not great, but the heavy bullet, even at comparatively low velocity, made it "a rather potent handgun round".

See also
List of cartridges by caliber
List of handgun cartridges
List of rimfire cartridges
13 mm caliber

References

Notes

Rimfire cartridges
Remington Arms cartridges